Baghdad International Airport , previously Saddam International Airport  is Iraq's largest international airport, located in a suburb about  west of downtown Baghdad in the Baghdad Governorate. It is the home base for Iraq's national airline, Iraqi Airways.

History

Pre-1982
The airport was developed under a consortium led by French company Spie Batignolles under an agreement made in 1979. The Iran-Iraq war delayed full opening of the airport until 1982. It opened as Saddam International Airport, bearing the name of then-Iraqi President Saddam Hussein.

1991–2003
Most of Baghdad's civilian flights stopped in 1991, when the United Nations imposed restrictions on Iraq after its invasion of Kuwait. After the Persian Gulf War, a no-fly zone imposed on Iraq by the United States and the United Kingdom meant that Iraqi Airways was only able to continue domestic flights for limited periods. Internationally, Baghdad was able to receive occasional charter flights carrying medicine, aid workers, and government officials. Royal Jordanian Airlines operated regular flights from Amman to Baghdad.

2003–2005 (U.S. occupation)

In April 2003, U.S.-led Coalition forces invaded Iraq and changed the airport's name to Baghdad International Airport. The ICAO code for the airport consequently changed from ORBS to ORBI. The IATA code subsequently switched from SDA to BGW, which had previously referred to all Baghdad airports, and before that to Al Muthana Airport when Saddam was in power.

Civilian control of the airport was returned to the Iraqi Government from the Coalition Provisional Authority in 2004.

2005–present
Sather Air Base came under periodic rocket fire from Baghdad. On 6 December 2006, a 107 mm rocket attack landed 30 yards (27.5 meters) from a parked C-5A aircraft, puncturing it with scores of shrapnel holes.

Terminal C was refreshed with three active gate areas for carriers operating from the airport.

Baghdad Airport Road, connecting the airport to the Green Zone, once a dangerous route full of IEDs, was refurbished with palm trees, manicured lawns, and a fountain, with Turkish assistance.

Military use
A separate enclave within the airport houses the New Al Muthana Air Base, where the Iraqi Air Force's 23rd Squadron is based, operating three Lockheed C-130E Hercules transport aircraft. The base is also home to a number of Sukhoi Su-25 attack aircraft.

Sather Air Base, or Camp Sather, was a United States Air Force base on the west side of the airport from 2003 to 2011. It was named in memory of Combat Controller Staff Sergeant Scott Sather, the first enlisted airman to die in Operation Iraqi Freedom. Sather was awarded the Bronze Star Medal with Valor for his leadership of a 24th Special Tactics Squadron reconnaissance task force during the initial stages of the 2003 U.S. invasion.

Airport developments
On 18 May 2010, plans were unveiled for an expansion of Baghdad International Airport, doubling its capacity to 15 million passengers per year. The expansion, to be funded by foreign investors, was to include construction of three new terminals and refurbishment of the existing three, each of which would accommodate 2.5 million passengers annually.

Airlines and destinations

Passenger

Cargo

Incidents and accidents
During the Gulf War, two Iraqi Airways Tupolev Tu-124Vs parked on the ground were destroyed by U.S. bombs.
In June 2000, two Saudi former military officers boarded a plane bound for London and diverted it to Baghdad. They wanted to claim asylum in Iraq, but Iraqi authorities later deported them to Saudi Arabia.
 On 22 November 2003, a European Air Transport Airbus A300B4 freighter, registered OO-DLL, operating on behalf of DHL Aviation, was hit by an SA-14 'Grail' missile shortly after takeoff. The airplane lost hydraulic pressure, causing a loss of control. After extending the landing gear to create more drag, the crew piloted the plane using differences in engine thrust and landed the plane with minimal further damage. All three crew survived. After the incident, civilian planes took to routinely performing corkscrew landings to minimise the risk of being hit by surface weapons.
On 26 January 2015, a flydubai Boeing 737-800 flying from Dubai to Baghdad with 154 passengers on board was hit by small-arms fire on approach to Baghdad International Airport. The plane landed safely. One passenger was injured when at least three bullets struck the plane. After the incident, UAE carriers FlyDubai and Emirates suspended their flights from Dubai to Baghdad. Flights by Turkish Airlines and Royal Jordanian were also temporarily suspended.
On 3 January 2020, a U.S. drone strike killed Qasem Soleimani, leader of Iran's Quds Force, and Abu Mahdi al-Muhandis, deputy commander of the Popular Mobilization Forces, as their convoy left the airport on or near Baghdad Airport Road.

See also
 List of airports in Iraq

References

External links

Baghdad Airport Arrivals and Departures  (non-official website)
Globalsecurity.org profile
Christian Science Monitor article on reconstruction, October 2003
Extensive photographs of Baghdad Airport – 12.07.2004

Buildings and structures in Baghdad
Airports in Iraq
Saddam Hussein
Transport in Baghdad
1987 establishments in Iraq